The Clayton McMichen Story is a double LP album by Merle Travis and Mac Wiseman released by CMH Records in 1982. It has not been released on CD.

Track listing
"Give the Fiddler a Dram"
"In the Pines"
"Fire On The Mountain" (Instrumental)
"Fifty Years Ago Waltz" (Instrumental)
"Hell Broke Loose in Georgia" (Instrumental)
"Trouble in Mind; Mcmichen's Reel" (Instrumental)
"Peach Pickin' Time in Georgia"
"Limehouse Blues" (Instrumental)
"The Convict and the Rose"
"Carroll County Blues" (Instrumental)
"House of the Rising Sun"
"I'm Looking Over a Four-Leaf Clover"
"Dreamy Georgiana Moon"
"Waiting for The Robert E. Lee" (Instrumental)
"Ida Red"
"Rock Jenny Rock" (Instrumental)
"Arkansas Traveler" (Instrumental)
"Bile 'Em Cabbage Down"; (Medley)
"In The Blue Hills of Virginia"
"Back to Old Smoky Mountain"
"Sweet Georgia Brown" (Instrumental)
"They Cut Down The Old Pine Tree"
"Darktown Strutters' Ball"
"Goodnight Waltz" (Instrumental)
"Farewell Blues" (Instrumental)
"Sweet Bunch of Daisies"

Personnel
Merle Travis
Mac Wiseman

Additional musicians

Joe Maphis
Fiddlin' Red Herron
Jackson D. Kane

References

1982 albums
Mac Wiseman albums
Merle Travis albums